Patrizia Bassis (born 18 March 1973 in Alzano Lombardo, Bergamo, Italy) is a retired Italian alpine skier who competed in the 2002 Winter Olympics.

References

External links
 

1973 births
Living people
Italian female alpine skiers
Olympic alpine skiers of Italy
Alpine skiers at the 2002 Winter Olympics
People from Alzano Lombardo
Sportspeople from the Province of Bergamo